Amrutha Vaani is a 2007 Indian Kannada-language romance film written, directed and co-produced by B. R. Rajashekar. It stars Ajay Rao and Radhika Kumaraswamy along with Naveen Krishna. The supporting cast includes Doddanna, Sadhu Kokila, Bullet Prakash, Girish and Girija Lokesh. The score and soundtrack for the film are by M. P. Naidu.

Cast 

 Naveen Krishna as Vishwas 
 Ajay Rao as Samarth
 Radhika Kumaraswamy as Sumathi
 Doddanna
 Sadhu Kokila
 Bullet Prakash
 Girish 
 Girija Lokesh
 Ashalatha
 M. S. Umesh
 NGF Ramamurthy
 Sridhar
 Karthik Sharma

Soundtrack 

The film's background score was by S. P. Venkatesh and the soundtrack was composed by M. P. Naidu. The music rights were acquired by Lahari Music.

References 

2000s Kannada-language films
Films shot in Mysore
Films shot in Bangalore
Indian romance films
2000s romance films